"So in Love" is a 1948 song by Cole Porter.

So in Love may also refer to:
So in Love (Andrew Hill album) (1960)
So in Love (Art Pepper album) (1980)
So in Love, song by Curtis Mayfield
"So in Love"" (Orchestral Manoeuvres in the Dark song) (1985)
"So in Love" (Jill Scott song) (2011)
"So in Love", by Jeremy Camp from Speaking Louder Than Before, 2008

See also
"So Much in Love", a 1963 song by The Tymes